Radula jonesii is a species of liverwort in the family Radulaceae. It is known from a few locations on Madeira and one location on Tenerife. The populations are small and vulnerable.

This liverwort forms dark green to olive green mats on rocks or on trees such as Laurus novocanariensis and Ocotea foetens. It is part of the old growth laurel forest ecosystem on the islands. On Madeira this ecosystem is protected.

References

Porellales
Plants described in 1988
Flora of the Canary Islands
Flora of Madeira
Taxonomy articles created by Polbot